Gender is the range of characteristics pertaining to, and differentiating between, masculinity and femininity.

Gender or Genders may also refer to:

Linguistics
 Grammatical gender, in linguistics, a system of noun classes
 Voice (grammar), in linguistics, a system of verb classes

Science and technology
 Gender, used as a synonym or polite euphemism for biological sex
 Gender of connectors and fasteners, the designation of male or female connectors in electrical and mechanical trades

Music
 Gendèr, an Indonesian musical instrument used in gamelan orchestras
 Gender of tonalities, in music, the designation of major and minor keys as masculine or feminine
 "Gender", a song from the album Candyass by Orgy
 "Gender", a song from the album Black Labyrinth by Jonathan Davis

Other uses
 Gender (stream), a stream in North Brabant, the Netherlands
 Genders (surname) (including a list of people with the name)

See also
 Language and gender
 Gender-neutral language
 Gender paradox
 Gender studies
 Genre
 

an:Chenero (desambigación)
ca:Gènere
es:Género
eu:Genero
fr:Genre
gl:Xénero
it:Genere
ko:젠더 (동음이의)
la:Genus
ja:属
oc:Genre
pl:Rodzaj
pt:Género
sq:Gjinia (kthjellim)
fi:Suku
sv:Genus